Chasing Rainbows may refer to:

Music
Chasing Rainbows Museum, museum based on the country music singer Dolly Parton

Albums
Chasing Rainbows (album), a 1977 album by Jane Olivor
Chasin' Rainbows, 1988, by Mickey Gilley
Chasing Rainbows, 2007, by Baby Woodrose
Chasing Rainbows, 2013, by Ray Wilson

Songs
"Chasing Rainbows" (song), 1996, by Shed Seven from Let It Ride
"Chasing Rainbows", Big Freedia song featuring Kesha, 2020
"Chasing Rainbows", 2013, by Bring Me the Horizon, from some editions of Sempiternal 
"Chasing Rainbows", by Billy Bragg from Tooth & Nail
"Chasing Rainbows", 1975, by Blue Magic from Thirteen Blue Magic Lane
"Chasing Rainbows", 2013, by Gaute Ormåsen, number-one song in Norway
"Chasing Rainbows", 2015, by Jenn Bostic from Faithful
"Chasing Rainbows", 2011, by Jay Mya 
"Chasing Rainbows", a 2021 single by John Mellencamp from Strictly a One-Eyed Jack
"Chasing Rainbows", by The Reverend Horton Heat from Rev
"Chasing Rainbows", song by Stanley Huang from Atheist Like Me
"Chasing Rainbows", song by Way Out West from Don't Look Now

Other uses
Chasing Rainbows (1930 film), American Pre-Code romantic musical film
Chasing Rainbows (2012 film), Romanian film
Chasing Rainbows (TV series), Canadian television drama miniseries, which aired on CBC Television in 1988
Chasing Rainbows, British Channel 4 music documentary series by Jeremy Marre
Hollyoaks: Chasing Rainbows
"Chasing Rainbows",  radio episode of WireTap
Chasing Rainbows, 2009 novel by Rowena Summers

See also
"I'm Always Chasing Rainbows", a popular vaudeville song